A total lunar eclipse took place on Friday, October 7, 1949, the second of two lunar eclipses in 1949.

Visibility

Related lunar eclipses

Lunar year series

Saros series

Half-Saros cycle
A lunar eclipse will be preceded and followed by solar eclipses by 9 years and 5.5 days (a half saros). This lunar eclipse is related to two total solar eclipses of Solar Saros 133.

Tritos 
 Preceded: Lunar eclipse of November 7, 1938
 Followed: Lunar eclipse of September 5, 1960

Tzolkinex 
 Preceded: Lunar eclipse of August 26, 1942
 Followed: Lunar eclipse of November 18, 1956

See also
List of lunar eclipses
List of 20th-century lunar eclipses

Notes

External links

1949-10
1949 in science